Prez may refer to:

Places 
Prez, Ardennes, France, a commune
Prez, Switzerland, a municipality

People 
Johnny Prez (born 1978), Jamaican reggaeton musician
Lester Young (1909–1959), American jazz musician nicknamed "Prez" or "Pres"
Pérez Prado (1916–1989), Cuban bandleader, mambo big band leader and percussionist nicknamed "Prez"

Fictional characters 
Prez (comics), several DC Comics characters
Roland "Prez" Pryzbylewski, on The Wire

See also
Des Prez, a surname
President (disambiguation)